Henry Blundell may refer to:
Henry Blundell (art collector) (1724–1810), English art collector
Henry Blundell-Hollinshead-Blundell (1831–1906), British MP
Henry Blundell (publisher) (1813–1878), New Zealand newspaper publisher